Malene Espensen (born 30 June 1981) is a Danish glamour model who resides and works in the United Kingdom. Espensen  has appeared as a Page 3 or pin-up girl in a number of tabloid newspapers, such as The Sun and Daily Star; and men's magazines including FHM, Playboy and M!.She was also the PinupFiles model of the month in July 2017.

She has also had a minor guest role in the British science series Brainiac: Science Abuse.

References

1981 births
Danish female models
Glamour models
Living people
Page 3 girls
People from Copenhagen